The Congolese Handball Federation (CHF) is the administrative and controlling body for handball and beach handball in the Republic of the Congo. Founded in 1970, CHF is a member of African Handball Confederation (CAHB) and the International Handball Federation (IHF).

National teams
 Congo men's national handball team
 Congo men's national junior handball team
 Congo women's national handball team

References

External links
 Congo at the IHF website.
 Congo at the CAHB website.

Handball in the Republic of the Congo
Handball
Sports organizations established in 1970
1970 establishments in the Republic of the Congo
Handball governing bodies
African Handball Confederation
National members of the International Handball Federation
Organisations based in Brazzaville